Obed Gómez a.k.a. "The Puerto Rican Picasso" (born 1966) is a Puerto Rican artist of modern art.

Early years
Gómez was born and raised in Santurce, a section of in San Juan, the capital city of Puerto Rico. His grandmother was the first to believe that someday he would become an artist when she saw him drawing at the age of three. He received his primary education in a public school, however when he was eleven he took  private art classes. He was sent to the League of Art of San Juan, where he took classes in drawing and painting.

After Gómez graduated from high school, he enrolled in the University of the Sacred Heart in San Juan. He also studied simultaneously at the Andres Buseo Academy where he took art classes. He earned his bachelor's degree in Communications with a minor in visual arts from the University of the Sacred Heart.

At first he was not successful as an artist and instead he faced personal problems which kept him from fulfilling his potential as an artist. His life changed when he moved to Orlando, Florida in 1995 and met his future wife Sarah Lloyd. Sarah encouraged him by insisting that he accompany her to art shows. She inspired him by telling him that he too could produce works of art. He also became a born again Christian. Gomez set up an art studio in a spare room of his home.

Artistic style
Gomez developed a style which ranges from vividly realistic to wildly abstract, with a lot of luscious whimsy in between. His subjects may vary from a dancer to a rooster with the colors of the Puerto Rican flag. The culture and heritage of Puerto Rico are represented in many of his paintings. Gomez's trademark is the bold and bright hues he favors. His art work have appeared on the covers of the Puerto Rican Professional and Business Leaders Guide, the brochure for Orlando's Puerto Rican Parade and O! Arts Magazine.

Exhibitions

His art work was exhibited at the Galeria Latina in Cornwall, England where a critic nicknamed him the "Puerto Rican Picasso".  His work has also been exhibited at the following places:

Solo exhibitions
 1995 - Universidad del Sagrado Corazon, Santurce, PR
 1999 - Puerto Rican Parade Art Exhibit, Orlando, Florida 99
 1999 - Sears Art Exhibit, Orlando, Florida
 1999 - Lockheed Martin-Orlando, Florida
 2000 - Puerto Rican Parade Art Exhibit, Orlando, Florida
 2001 - Darden's Hispanic Heritage Art Exhibit, Orlando, Florida
 2001 - Orlando Public Library Art Exhibit, Orlando, Florida
 2003 - Office of the Governor of Florida, Orlando, Florida
 2004 - Moore Multicultural Center at Brevard Community College, Cocoa, Florida
 2004 - Valencia Community College East Campus, Orlando, Florida
 2005 - "Childhood Memories" Art Exhibit, Brevard Community College, Cocoa, Florida
 2005 - "The Colors of Life" Art Exhibit, The House of Arts, Casselberry, Florida
 2006 - Solo Exhibit, Solo Exhibit Dale Mabry Campus Art Gallery, Tampa, Florida

Group exhibitions
 1999 - Latin American Art Exhibition, Valencia Community College-Orlando, Florida
 2000 - Orange County's Hispanic Art & History Exhibit, Orlando, Fl.
 2000 - Lockheed Martin-Orlando, Florida
 2000 - Latin American Art Exhibition, Valencia Community College-Orlando, Florida
 2000 - Festival Taino 2000, Las Americas Museum of Art - Kissimmee, Florida
 2000 - Hispanic Heritage Celebration, Lockheed Martin-Orlando, Florida
 2000 - Orange County's Hispanic Art & History Exhibit, Orlando, Florida
 2001 - Historical Society of Central Florida Hispanic Art Exhibit Orlando, Florida
 2001 - Hispanic Heritage Art Exhibit 2001 Orlando, Florida
 2001 - Shin-Dig Orange County Regional History Center Orlando, Florida
 2001 - Lockheed Martin-Orlando, Florida
 2001 - Puerto Rican Parade Art Exhibit, Orlando, Florida
 2001 - Latin American Art Exhibition, Valencia Community College-Orlando, Florida
 2004- "Travel, Adventure & Motion" Platform #3 Exhibit, Lakeland, Florida
 2004- "La Dolce Vita Exhibit" 1st Thursdays at The Orlando Museum of Art (OMA), Orlando, Florida
 2004- Pura Vida Gallery, Atlanta, GA
 2004- "Colores del Caribe", Casselberry City Hall, Casselberry, Florida
 2004- Brevard Museum of Art & Science, Melbourne, Florida
 2004- "The Floridian-Puerto Rican Art Connection" Kissimmee City Hall, Kissimmee, Florida
 2005- "Hispanic Expressions" Art Exhibit, University of Central Florida (UCF), Orlando, Florida
 2005- "Presencia Boricua" Art Exhibit, Museum Of The Americas(MoA), Miami, Florida
 2005- "Latin Fusion", Casselberry City Hall, Casselberry, Florida

Honors and recognitions
In 2003, Gomez was named the godfather of the Melbourne Puerto Rican Day Parade. In 2004 Lifetime Network, choose Gomez's artwork to decorate the set of "Division". In that year, he was also awarded the Paoli Award in the Visual Arts Category.

Even though some of his paintings have sold for over $5,000 (U.S. Dollars), Gomez has donated many of his works to children fund raising auctions. He also created the web page for "Give Kids the World", an organization which grants wishes to children with life-threatening diseases.

Currently
Obed Gomez is currently a graphic designer, painter and a youth art professor. He lives in Orlando with his wife and children.

See also

List of Puerto Ricans

References

External links
http://www.obedart.com/sentinel.html

1966 births
Living people
Puerto Rican painters
People from Santurce, Puerto Rico
People from Orlando, Florida
Converts to Christianity
Date of birth missing (living people)